Chris Pither (born 3 December 1986) is a New Zealand professional racing driver.
Pither has won eight national championships including; three New Zealand karting titles, the New Zealand Holden HQ Series in 2003 and 2004, the NZ V8 Ute Championship Series in 2010 as well as the NZ and Australian V8 Ute Racing Series in 2011.

Biography
Pither started racing in his home country, coming up through the open wheeler ranks first through the evolved Formula Vee class Formula First, then Formula Ford. After a couple of seasons racing in the one-make HQ Holden series, an impressive top five championship result in the inaugural Toyota Racing Series led to a move to Australia and two seasons in the popular V8 Utes series. For the 2006 season, Pither joined Brad Jones Racing in the second-tier Fujitsu V8 Supercar Series. A sporadic 2007 campaign, switching teams mid-season did not bring positive results, however still managed to join tail-marking main-game V8 Supercars outfit Team Kiwi Racing for four rounds during the 14-event season. After subbing for regular driver Kayne Scott at the Eastern Creek Raceway round, he then participated in a second round at the Winton Motor Raceway, although the results were not spectacular. The endurance races were particularly disappointing after an engine failure in practice saw Team Kiwi Racing withdraw from the L&H 500. Pither was involved in a major accident during practice for the Supercheap Auto 1000. Pither struck a stationary Paul Weel with a heavy impact at Reid Park corner, causing extensive damage to both cars and hospitalising Weel. The Falcon was miraculously repaired in time to start the race, but unfortunately was the race's first retirement. Pither parted ways with the team and he took a hiatus from racing in 2009.

Pither's return to V8 Supercars would come in 2012 when he signed to drive in the endurance races with David Wall in the #21 Brad Jones Racing Commodore - a signing that would lead Pither to a full-time drive in the Dunlop V8 Supercar Series.

In late November 2015, it was announced that Pither would be driving for Super Black Racing in 2016. He left the now-defunct team at end of 2016. Pither then moved to Erebus Motorsport to co-drive alongside Dale Wood in 2017. The pair recorded a best result of 4th, which came at the Bathurst 1000. For 2018 Pither has moved to Garry Rogers Motorsport as a co-driver.

In 2020, Pither signed to drive for Team Sydney full time. Coca-Cola came onboard to sponsor him throughout the season. He drove the #22 Holden Commodore. His best finish in the season would be a 5th place at Hidden Valley. He would end the season finishing 20th in the points.

Career results
Some results sourced from:

Supercars Championship results

Bathurst 1000 results

References

External links
 
 Chris Pither profile on US Racing Reference
 V8 Supercars Official Profile

1986 births
New Zealand racing drivers
Living people
Supercars Championship drivers
Toyota Racing Series drivers
Sportspeople from Palmerston North
V8SuperTourer drivers
Australian Endurance Championship drivers
Garry Rogers Motorsport drivers
Nismo drivers